The Roman Catholic Diocese of Perpignan–Elne (Latin: Dioecesis Elnensis; French: Diocèse de Perpignan–Elne; Catalan: Bisbat de Perpinyà–Elna) is a diocese of the Latin Church of the Roman Catholic Church in France. The diocese comprises the Department of Pyrénées-Orientales. This see continues the old Diocese of Elne, which was renamed and had its see relocated at Perpignan, in 1601 after a papal bull of Pope Clement VIII. Its territory brought together the Diocese of Elne, part of the Spanish Diocese of Urgel known as French Cerdagne, three cantons of the Diocese of Alet, and two villages of the Diocese of Narbonne.

The Diocese of Elne was a suffragan of the Diocese of Narbonne until 1511. Pope Julius II made the Diocese of Elne directly subject to the Holy See in 1511, but on 22 January 1517 Pope Leo X reversed the policy, and the Diocese of Elne became again a suffragan of the Diocese of Narbonne.  In 1482, by virtue of a Decree of the Council of Trent, Pope Gregory XIII made it a suffragan of the Archdiocese of Tarragona. After 1678 it was again a suffragan of the Diocese of Narbonne.

The department of Pyrénées-Orientales was united in 1802 to the Diocese of Carcassonne.  The diocese was to be reestablished by the Concordat of 11 June 1817, but the French Parliament did not approve the treaty.   The Diocese of Perpignan was therefore re-established by papal bull in 1822, and was made suffragan to the Archdiocese of Albi. Its see is the Perpignan Cathedral (French: Basilique-Cathédrale de Saint-Jean-Baptiste de Perpignan; Catalan: Catedral de Sant Joan Baptista de Perpinyà).

History

The Diocese of Elne was created in the 6th century. The first known Bishop of Elne was Dominus, mentioned in 571 in the Chronicle of John of Biclarum. Among others are Cardinal Ascanio Maria Sforza (1494–1495), Cardinal Caesar Borgia (1495–1498), Cardinal Francisco Lloris y de Borja (1499–1506), Cardinal Jacques de Serra (1506–1512), Cardinal Girolamo Doria (1530–1533), and Bishop Olympe-Philippe Gerbet (1854–1864).

The Cathedral of Elne (eleventh century) and the adjoining cloister are rich examples of elaborate medieval ornamentation. In the later Middle Ages, and under the influence of Roman Law, Roussillon witnessed revivals of slavery; this is proved by numerous purchase deeds of Muslim and Christian slaves, dating back to the fourteenth and fifteenth centuries.

The diocese honours especially St. Vincent de Collioure, martyr (end of the third century); and St. Eulalia and St. Julia, virgins and martyrs (end of third century). In memory of former ties with the metropolis of Tarragona, the Church of Perpignan honours several Spanish saints: St. Fructuosus, Bishop of Tarragona, and his deacons Augurius and Eulogius, martyred at Tarragona in 259; some martyrs of the Diocletian persecution (end of third century); Justa and Rufina of Seville; Felix and Narcissus of Gerona; Aciselus and Victoria of Cordova; Leocadia, of Toledo; and St. Ildefonsus (607-667), Archbishop of Toledo.

After becoming Bishop of Elne in 1495, Caesar Borgia decided to raise the taxes on the clergy, resulting in an uprising in 1497. Those same taxes were cut in half the following year, after the clergy complained to the king.

The Benedictine Dom Briard (1743–1828), who continued the series of Historiens de France, belonged to Perpignan. At Perpignan Pope Benedict XIII (Pedro de Luna) held a council on 1 November 1408, to rally his partisans; they gradually melted away and on 1 February 1409, the eighteen remaining bishops advised the antipope to send ambassadors to Pisa to negotiate with Pope Gregory XII.

Numerous councils were held at Elne: in 1027 (the Synod of Toulouges), 1058, 1114, 1335, 1337, 1338, 1339, 1340, and 1380. The council held in 1027 decreed that no one should attack his enemy from Saturday at nine o'clock to Monday at one; and that Holy Mass be said for the excommunicated for a space of three months, to obtain their conversion. The author of l'Art de verifier les Dates wrongly maintains that the Council of Elvira was held at Elne.

The chief places of pilgrimage of the diocese are: Notre-Dame du Château d'Ultréra, at Sorède; Notre-Dame de Consolation, at Collioure; Notre-Dame de Font Romeu, at Odeillo; Notre-Dame de Forca-Réal, near Millas; Notre-Dame de Juigues, near Rivesaltes; and the relics of Sts. Abdon and Sennen at Arles on the Tech.

Bishops

To 1000

 Domnus (c. 571)
 Benenatus (c. 589)
 Acutulus (c. 633 to 638)
 Witaricus (c. 656)
 Clarus (c. 683)
 Wenedurius (783–788)
 Ramnon (825–826)
 Salomó (832–836)
 Audesinus (860–885)
 Riculf I (885–915)
 Almeraldus (Elmerald, Elmerat) (916–920)
 Wadaldus (Guadaldus de Empuries-Rosselló) (920–947)
 Riculf II (947–966)
 Suniarius I (967–977)
 Hildesindus (979–991)
 Berenguer de Cerdanya-Besalú (993–994) (son of Oliba Cabreta)
 Fredelo (994–999) 
 Berenguer de Cerdanya-Besalú (999–1003) (second time)

1000 to 1300

 Fredelo (1003–1007) (second time)
 Oliva de Besora (1009–1014)
 Berenguer III. de Sendred de Gurb (1019–1030)
 Suniari II. (1031)
 Berenguer IV. (1032–1053)
 Artal I. (1054–1061)
 Suniari III (1062)
 Ramon I. (1064–1086)
 Artal II. (1087–1096)
 Armengol (1097–1111)
 Petrus Bernardi (Pere Bernat) (1113–1129)
 Udalgà de Castellnou (1130–1147)
 Artal III. (1148–1171)
 Guillem Jordà (1172–1186)
 Berenguer V. (1187)
 Guillem de Céret (1187–1197)
 Artal IV. (1200–1201)
 Guillem de Ortafa (1202–1209)
 Ramon de Vilallonga (1212–1216)
 Gualter (1217–1221)
 Arnald de Serrallonga (1223–1224)
 Ramon III. (1225–1229)
 Bernat de Berga (1230–1259)
 Berenguer de Cantallops (1259–1280)
 Bernat de Sala (1280–1281)
 Berenguer de Sainte-Foi (1282–1289)
 Ramon de Costa (1289–1310)

1300 to 1500

 Raimundus Costa (Ramón V) (1311–1312)
 Guillerm de Castelló, O.S.B. (1313–1317)
 Berenguer d'Argilaguers (1317–1320)
 Berenguer Batlle (1320–1332)
 Guido de Terrena (1332–1342)
 Pere Seguier (1342–1346)
 Bernat Hug de Santa Artèmia (1347–1348)
 Bernat Fournier (1348–1350)
 Estebe Malet (1350–1351)
 Francesc de Montoliu (1352–1354)
 Joan Jouffroi (1354–1357)
 Ramon de Salgues (1357–1361)
 Petrus de Flanella  (Pere de Planella) (1361–1371)
 Petrus de Cima, O.Min. (Pere Cima) (1371–1377)
 Ramon d'Escales (1377–1380)
 Dalmatius (Dalmaci) (1380–1384)
 Bartholomeus Peyroni (Bartolomeu Peyró), O.Carm. (1384–1408)
 Raymond de Castella (Ramon de Descatllar y de Palassol) (1408) (transferred to Gerona)
 Francisco Ximenes (Francesc Eiximenis), O. Min. (1408–1409)
 Alphonsus de Tous (Alfons d'Eixea) (1409–1410)
 Jerònim d'Ocó (1410–1425)
 Joan de Casanova (1425–1431)
 Galcerà d'Albert (1431–1453)
 Joan de Margarit (1453–1462)
 Antoni de Cardona (1462–1467)
 Joan Pintor (1468–1470)
 Charles de Saint-Gelais (Carles de Sant Gelai) (1470–1473)
 Charles de Martigny (Carles de Martiny) (1475–1494)
 Ascanio Maria Sforza (1494–1495) (never took possession)
 Cesar Borja (1495–1498) (never consecrated)
 Francisco Lloris y de Borja (1499–1506)

From 1500

 Santiago de Serra y Cau (1506–1513)
 Juan Castellanos de Villalba (1513–1515)
 Bernardo de Mesa, O.P. (1517–1524)
 Guillermo Valdenese (1524–1529)
 Fernando Valdés (1529–1530) (transferred to Orense)
 Cardinal Girolamo Doria (1530–1532)  (Administrator)
 Jaime de Rich, O.S.B. (1534–1537)
 Jeronimo de Requesens (1537–1542)
 Fernando de Loaces y Pérez, O.P. (1542–1543)
 Pedro Agustín (1543–1545)
 Miguel Despuig (1545–1555)
 Rafael Ubach (1555–1558)
 Lope Martínez de Lagunilla (1558–1567)
 Pedro Martir Coma, O.P. (1568–1578)
 Joan Terès i Borrull (1579–1586)
 Pedro Bonet de Santa María (1586–1588)
Agustín Gaillart, O.S.B. (1588) 
Luis de Sans i Codol (1588) 
 Fernando de Valdés Salas (1589–1598) (also Bishop of Vic)
 Onofre Reart (1599–1608) name change

Bishops of Perpignan

 Joan de Palau 
 Antonio Gallart y Traginer (1609–1612)
 Francisco de Vera Villavicencio, O. de la Merced (1613–1616)
 Federico Cornet (1617)
 Ramón Ivorra (1617–1618)
 Rafael Ripoz, O.P. (1618–1620)
 Francisco de Santjust y de Castro, O.S.B. (1621–1622)
 Pedro Magarola Fontanet (1622–1627)
 Francisco López de Mendoza (1627–1629)
 Gregorio Parcero de Castro, O.S.B. (1630–1634)
 Gaspar Prieto Orduña, O. de M. (1636–1637)
François Perez Roy (Francisco Pérez Roy, Francesc Pères i Roi) (1638–1643) (transferred to Guadix)
Joseph du Vivier de Saint-Martin (1643) (Vicar-General, not Bishop)
Vacant (1643–1668)
Vincent de Margarit, O.P. (1668–1672)
Jean-Louis de Bruelh (1673–1675) (Bishop-elect)
Jean-Baptiste d`Étampes de Valençay (1675–1680)
Louis Habert de Montmort (1682–1695)
Jean Hervé Basan de Flamenville (1695–1721)
Antoine Boivin de Vaurouy (1721)
Vacant (1721–1726)
Jean Mathias Barthélemy de Gramont de Lanta (1726–1743)
Charles-François-Alexandre de Cardevac D'Havrincourt (1743–1783)
Jean Gabriel D’Agay (1783–1788)
Antoine-Félix de Leyris D'Esponchez (1788–1790) (1801)
Gabriel Deville (1791–1793)  (Constitutional Bishop of Pyrénées Orientales)
Dominique-Paul Villa (Constitutional Bishop)  (1798–1801)
 Jean-François de Saunhac-Belcastel (1822–1853)
 Philippe-Olympe Gerbet (1853–1864)
 Etienne-Emile Ramadié (1864–1876)
 Joseph-Frédéric Saivet (1876–1877)
 Jean-Auguste-Emile Caraguel (1877–1885)
 Noël-Mathieu-Victor-Marie Gaussail (1886–1899)
 Jules-Louis-Marie de Carsalade du Pont (1899–1932)
 Henri-Marius Bernard (1933–1959)
 Joël-André-Jean-Marie Bellec (1960–1971)
 Henry-Camille-Gustave-Marie L'Heureux (1972–1981)
 Jean Chabbert, O.F.M. (1982–1996)
 André Louis Fort (1996–2002)
 André Marceau (2004–2014)
 Norbert Turini (installed 18 January 2015)

See also 
 Catholic Church in France
 List of Catholic dioceses in France

References

Bibliography

Reference works
 pp. 599–601. (Use with caution; obsolete)
  (in Latin) pp. 238–239.
 (in Latin) p. 150.
 p. 192.
 pp. 181–182.
 pp. 193–194.
 p. 206.

Studies

 Brutails, Jean-Auguste (1886), "Étude sur l'esclavage en Roussillon du XIIe au XVIIe siècle,"  

 second edition (in French)

 Toreilles, Perpignan pendent la Revolution (3 vols., 1896–97)

External links
New Advent article

Perpignan
Perpignan-Elne
Perpignan-Elne
1817 establishments in France